{{Speciesbox
|image=
|image_caption=
|genus=Iwakawatrochus
|parent_authority=Kuroda & Habe, 1954
|species=urbanus
|authority=(Gould, 1861) 
|synonyms_ref=
|synonyms=* Cantharidus (Iwakawatrochus) urbanus (Gould, 1861)
 Cantharidus urbanus (Gould, 1861)
 Gibbula eucosmia Pilsbry, 1895
 Ziziphinus urbanus Gould, 1861 (original combination)
}}Iwakawatrochus  urbanus is a species of sea snail in the family Trochidae, the top snails. It is the only species in the genus Iwakawatrochus''.

Description
The size of the shell varies between 4 mm and 10 mm.

Distribution
This marine species occurs off Korea and the Philippines.

References

  Higo, S., Callomon, P. & Goto, Y. (1999) Catalogue and Bibliography of the Marine Shell-Bearing Mollusca of Japan. Elle Scientific Publications, Yao, Japan, 749 pp.

External links
 
 Pilsbry, H. A. (1895). Catalogue of the marine shells of Japan with descriptions of new species and notes on others collected by Frederick Stearns. F. Stearns, Detroit, viii + 196 pp, 11 pls
 Tryon (1889), Manual of Conchology XI, Academy of Natural Sciences, Philadelphia

Trochidae
Gastropods described in 1861